25 Miles to Kissimmee is the sixth studio album by German pop band Fool's Garden, released in 2003. It is also the last album featuring all of the original members of the band. The title track is about a girl who attempts to seduce her married passenger while she is driving them  into a city for unspecified reasons.

Track listing
 "Closer"
 "Tears Run Dry"
 "Dreaming" (original version)
 "Bighouse Pyromaniac"
 "Bighouse" (reprise)
 "Material World"
 "Reason"
 "Glory"
 "25 Miles to Kissimmee"
 "Silence"
 "I Won't Kill Myself"
 "Ismael"
 "Rolling Home"
 "Closer" (2001 version) – bonus track

Musicians
Peter Freudenthaler – vocals
Volker Hinkel – guitars, programming, backing vocals
Roland Röhl – keyboards
Thomas Mangold – bass
Ralf Wochele – drums
Hellmut Hattler – bass on "Tears Run Dry", "Material World" and "I Won't Kill Myself"
Jochen Schmalbach – drums and programming on "Tears Run Dry", "Material World" and "25 Miles to Kissimmee"

Singles
Dreaming
Closer

Trivia
The song "Dreaming", originally released as a single in 2001, was re-recorded in 2004 for a new single release. The new version was later included as a bonus track on the band's seventh album Ready for the Real Life.
A new version of "Reason", titled "Reason 2.0", appears on the band's EP Home, with new arrangements and different verses, but with an identical chorus.

2003 albums
Fools Garden albums